The Chevron B2 was the second car to be developed and built by British manufacturer Chevron, in 1966. Designed by Derek Bennett, it was lightweight open-wheel sports car, specifically intended and purpose-built to compete in the clubman class series of racing; a series for front-engined sports prototype cars. Like its predecessor, it was constructed out of a steel tubular spaceframe chassis, covered in aluminum body panels. This meant it was very light, weighing only . It was powered by a naturally-aspirated  Ford-Cosworth. Only four cars were produced. Over its racing career, spanning two years (1966, 1971), it won a single race (plus 2 additional class wins), at Oulton Park in 1966, and also scored 8 podium finishes, and clinched 1 pole position.

References

Chevron racing cars
Sports prototypes
Open wheel racing cars
Sports racing cars